Kesara M. Amitha de Costa (1949 – 8 June 2019) was a cricketer who played first-class cricket for Sri Lanka from 1973 to 1975. He was an opening batsman.

Amitha de Costa attended Thurstan College in Colombo, where he was a prominent member of the cricket team from 1967 to 1969. He played his first match of first-class cricket for Sri Lanka against the touring English team in 1972–73, scoring 12 in the first innings, when he took 65 minutes to make his first run.

He toured India with the Sri Lankan team in 1975-76. He scored 80 against West Zone and was included in the side for the second of the three matches against India. He scored 13 and 31 but Sri Lanka lost and he lost his place for the third match.

In 2017, he was one of the first players to receive financial assistance under a new scheme to help former national players with medical expenses. In September 2018, he was one of 49 former Sri Lankan cricketers felicitated by Sri Lanka Cricket, to honour them for their services before Sri Lanka became a full member of the International Cricket Council (ICC).

References

External links

Alumni of Thurstan College
Sri Lankan cricketers
1949 births
2019 deaths
Place of birth missing